"Free and Easy (Down the Road I Go)" is a song co-written and recorded by American country music artist Dierks Bentley. It was released in June 2007 as the third single from his 2006 album Long Trip Alone. It became his fifth Number One single on the U.S. Billboard Hot Country Songs charts.  The song was made available as downloadable content for the game Rock Band on December 16, 2008. The song was written by Bentley, Brett Beavers, Rob Harrington and Rod Janzen.

Critical reception
Kevin John Coyne of Country Universe gave the song a B+ grade, saying that it was "an uptempo, breezy romp with plenty of banjo and carefree charm."

Chart performance

Year-end charts

Certifications

References

2007 singles
2006 songs
Dierks Bentley songs
Songs written by Dierks Bentley
Songs written by Brett Beavers
Capitol Records Nashville singles
Song recordings produced by Brett Beavers